Mohideen A. Kadar (born November 5, 1942) is an Indian politician from the Dravida Munnetra Kazhagam. He served as a member of the Rajya Sabha from 1998 to 2003. Kadar is married to Safia Kadar. The couple have 3 sons and 1 daughter.

References
 

Dravida Munnetra Kazhagam politicians
1942 births
Living people
Rajya Sabha members from Tamil Nadu
Place of birth missing (living people)